USS Tallahatchie County (LST-1154) was the second of only two Talbot County-class tank landing ships (LSTs) built for the United States Navy just after World War II. Named after Tallahatchie County, Mississippi, she was the only U.S. Navy vessel to bear the name.

Construction
LST-1154 was laid down on 4 August 1945 at the Boston Navy Yard; launched on 19 July 1946; sponsored by Mrs. Wilder D. Baker; and commissioned on 24 May 1949. She recommissioned as an AVB in 1962.

History
From her commissioning until 1962, LST-1154 alternated assignments for the Amphibious Force, Atlantic Fleet along the east coast of the United States with assignment to the 6th Fleet during periodic deployments to the Mediterranean. She was redesignated USS Tallahatchie County (LST-1154) on 1 July 1955.  She was decommissioned at Charleston (SC) Naval Shipyard in 1960 in preparation for conversion to AVB-2.

On 3 February 1962 her conversion was completed to an Advance Aviation Base Ship (one of two ships of the steam-powered LST-1153-class) and redesignated USS Tallahatchie County (AVB-2.) Her aft superstructure was extended forward and her forecastle built up; electronic antennas and a heavy king post were mounted amidships. As an AVB, Tallahatchie County was designed to provide command and logistic facilities to a squadron of P-2 Neptune antisubmarine patrol planes operating from an improvised land base in Souda Bay, Crete. Squadron equipment was carried in mobile vans, transported in Tallahatchie County's tank deck, and landed over her bow ramp.

For the remainder of her career, Tallahatchie County provided support to aviation units in the Mediterranean. She was decommissioned on 3 January 1970 and struck from the Naval Vessel Register on 15 July 1970. Tallahatchie County was sold for scrapping to Contieri Navali Santa Maria of Genoa, Italy in July 1970.

References

See also
 
 List of United States Navy LSTs

Talbot County-class tank landing ships
Cold War amphibious warfare vessels of the United States
Cold War auxiliary ships of the United States
Tallahatchie County, Mississippi
Ships built in Boston
1946 ships